Pedro Canale, better known as his stage name Chancha Vía Circuito is a producer, DJ/remixer and composer, from Greater Buenos Aires, Argentina.
Fusion of electronic music and cumbia is key factor of Chancha Vía Circuito's music. He explores the minimal side of digital cumbia with inspiration from Afro-dance, murgas, minimal dub, IDM, and downtempo. Computer bleeps share sonic space with folkloric chant. Candombe drums are accompanied by the sample of a machete splicing the air and a vocal line of indigenous bebop is layered over hints of dub.

Canale launched an EP "Bienaventuranza remixes", with collaborations from Nicola Cruz, El Búho, Rafael Aragon and Baiuca. He released an album in December 2018 with his project “Pino Europeo”, in collaboration accordion player Chango Spasiuk.

Since 2010 Chancha Vía Circuito is one of the favorite artists of NPR's Alt.Latino.

Discography 
Source:

Albums 
 Rodante (2008)
 Río Arriba (2010)
 Los Pastores Mixtape (2010)
 Amansara (2014)
 Bienaventuranza (2018)
 Pino Europeo (2018)
 La Estrella (2022)

Singles & EPs 
 Bersa Discos (2008)
 Rodante (2008)
 Semillas EP (2012)
 Coplita  (2014)
 Como Noide  (2019)
Pleamar  (2020)

DJ Mixes 
 Río Arriba Mixtape (2010)
 Mixtape Cumbiero - European Tour 2013 (2013)

References

External links 
 Chancha Vìa Circuito on facebook
 Chancha Vìa Circuito on SoundCloud
 Chancha Vìa Circuito by ZZK RECORDS
 Chancha Vìa Circuito by ZZK RECORDS

Musicians from Buenos Aires
Argentine record producers
Argentine DJs
Techno musicians
Traditional musicians
Industrial musicians
Living people
21st-century Argentine musicians
Electronic dance music DJs
Year of birth missing (living people)